The Jessie and John F. Kern House is a German Renaissance Revival style mansion completed in 1900. The home was built for Wisconsin Industrialist John Kern. The home is located in Milwaukee, Wisconsin in the Gilman’s Subdivision of Part of Lockwood’s Addition in the North Point North Historic District. The home was completed in 1900 and was listed in the Wisconsin state register July 16, 1999 and added to the National Register March 24, 2000.

History
John Kern purchased the land on Park Avenue in 1899 and in August of 1899, it was reported in the local news that Kern would build the home at cost between $20,000 and $25,000 (approximately $659,197.59 to $751,557.69 in 2021 dollars). The building was to be constructed with stone and brick and Crane & Barkhausen were to be the architects. The Krueger family bought the home in the 1930s. In the 1950s the home was converted into a duplex. In subsequent years the home was remodeled and repurposed and now it survives as a historic masion.

Architectural elements

The building is an example of German Renaissance Revival style. The building is considered a villa. The wealthy Germans in the Milwaukee area built many homes in the style. The home has a brick facade and arcaded corbeling which are typical of this German revival style. The ornamental iron work was done by Cyril Colnik. The home is considered to be one of the first to have zoned air conditioning system. The home has 16 rooms: five bedrooms, four and a half baths. The front of the building features an octagonal bartizan. The front porch has large stone arches. The interior of the home has stained glass windows in every room, woodwork throughout and a multiple fireplaces. The floors are adorned with beautiful inlaid wood. The home's parlor is replete with Honduran mahogany.

See also
National Register of Historic Places listings in Milwaukee, Wisconsin

References

External links
Landmark hunter

Historic sites in Wisconsin
Residential buildings on the National Register of Historic Places in Wisconsin
National Register of Historic Places in Milwaukee
1900 establishments in Wisconsin
Historic American Buildings Survey in Wisconsin
1900s architecture in the United States